Tayliah Zimmer (born 24 May 1985 in Barham) is an Australian swimmer.

See also
 List of World Aquatics Championships medalists in swimming (women)
 World record progression 4 × 100 metres medley relay

References

1985 births
Living people
Australian female backstroke swimmers
World record setters in swimming
World Aquatics Championships medalists in swimming
Medalists at the FINA World Swimming Championships (25 m)
Commonwealth Games medallists in swimming
Commonwealth Games bronze medallists for Australia
Swimmers at the 2006 Commonwealth Games
Medallists at the 2006 Commonwealth Games